Byeongjeom Depot Line is a subway line operated by Seoul Metropolitan Subway, in Seoul, South Korea. It is part of Seoul Metro's Line 1.

Stations

See also
Subways in South Korea
Seoul Subway Line 1

Seoul Metropolitan Subway lines
Railway lines in South Korea